Dickwella Patabendige Dilantha Niroshan Dickwella, known as Niroshan Dickwella (born 23 June 1993), is a professional Sri Lankan cricketer, who plays all formats of the game for Sri Lanka. A left-hand batsman, he also plays as a wicket-keeper of the team. Dickwella is known for hitting left handed Dilscoops. In November 2017, he was named the emerging cricketer of the year for the 2016–17 season at Sri Lanka Cricket's annual awards.

Domestic and T20 franchise career
In March 2018, he was named as the vice-captain of Kandy's squad for the 2017–18 Super Four Provincial Tournament. He was the leading run-scorer for Kandy during the tournament, with 315 runs in three matches. The following month, he was also named as the vice-captain of Kandy's squad for the 2018 Super Provincial One Day Tournament.

In August 2018, he was named in Galle's squad the 2018 SLC T20 League. In March 2019, he was named in Dambulla's squad for the 2019 Super Provincial One Day Tournament.

In June 2019, he was selected to play for the Montreal Tigers franchise team in the 2019 Global T20 Canada tournament. In October 2020, he was drafted by the Dambulla Viiking for the inaugural edition of the Lanka Premier League. In November 2021, he was selected to play for the Dambulla Giants following the players' draft for the 2021 Lanka Premier League. In July 2022, he was signed by the Colombo Stars for the third edition of the Lanka Premier League.

International career
He made his Test cricket debut for Sri Lanka against South Africa in July 2014. He made his One Day International debut for Sri Lanka against India on 16 November 2014. He made his Twenty20 International (T20I) debut for Sri Lanka against India on 9 February 2016.

Dickwella was originally included into 2016 ICC World Twenty20 Sri Lanka squad, but due to poor performances in India tour and 2016 Asia Cup, he was dropped from the world cup squad.

Dickwella was called up for the South African limited over tour after fine performances in domestic tournaments. He was included in the T20I side as the opening batsman and scored quick innings in all three matches. He scored his maiden T20I fifty as a match-winning knock in the third match, which ensured the first series win against South Africa on their home soil in any format. Dickwella was adjudged both man of the match and player of the series for his match-winning batting performances.

After the ban, he looked forward to coming back to the squad for second ODI against Bangladesh in late March 2017. However, he was ruled out of the series due to hairline fracture in his left hand.

He scored his first ODI century on 6 July 2017 against Zimbabwe at the Mahinda Rajapaksa International Cricket Stadium. Along with Danushka Gunathilaka, they made a 229-run partnership for the first wicket, where Gunathilaka also scored his first ODI century. Sri Lanka chased 310 to win the match, which was the first 300-plus chase by Sri Lanka on home soil. In the fourth ODI against Zimbabwe, he and Danushka Gunathilaka set the record for becoming the first pair of batsmen to score two successive 200-plus partnerships in ODIs.

In May 2018, he was one of 33 cricketers to be awarded a national contract by Sri Lanka Cricket ahead of the 2018–19 season. In March 2021, during the first Test against the West Indies, he set a new record for scoring the most half centuries by a batsman (17) in Test cricket without scoring a century, passing the previous record held by Chetan Chauhan.

In June 2022, he was named in the Sri Lanka A squad for their matches against Australia A during Australia's tour of Sri Lanka. In the Australian Test series in July 2022, Sri Lanka suffered a huge defeat, with the match ending in three days. In the match, Dickwella was the only Sri Lankan player to score a fifty, scoring 58 runs in the first innings.

Disciplinary issues
In July 2014, on his Test debut, he was fined 10% of the match fees for claiming unfair catch.

During the fourth ODI against South Africa on 7 February 2017, Dickwella had a verbal encounter with Kagiso Rabada and was fined, along with gaining three demerit points. On 21 February 2017, Dickwella was suspended for two limited over matches, after a Code of Conduct breach during the second T20I against Australia at Kardinia Park. He was fined 30% of his match fees and was given two more demerit points.

In July 2017, Dickwella was fined 30 percent of his match fee and received two demerit points for breaching the ICC Code of Conduct. during the ODI against Zimbabwe.

On 28 June 2021, Sri Lanka Cricket (SLC) suspended Dickwella, Kusal Mendis and Danushka Gunathilaka after they breached the team's bio-secure bubble during Sri Lanka's tour of England. All three players were seen in the city centre of Durham, with SLC sending them all back home ahead of the ODI matches. In July 2021, following the outcome of the incident, Dickwella was suspended from playing in international cricket for one year. Sri Lanka Cricket agreed to lift the ban early, rescinding the punishment in January 2022.

Accolades
Schoolboy Cricketer of the Year 2012
Dialog SLC Emerging Cricketer of the Year 2016–17.

References

External links

1993 births
Alumni of Trinity College, Kandy
Colombo Commandos cricketers
Living people
Nondescripts Cricket Club cricketers
Sri Lankan cricketers
Sri Lanka Test cricketers
Sri Lanka One Day International cricketers
Sri Lanka Twenty20 International cricketers
Southern Express cricketers
Wayamba cricketers
Saint Lucia Kings cricketers
Dambulla Aura cricketers
Wicket-keepers